The pancreatic duct, or duct of Wirsung (also, the major pancreatic duct due to the existence of an accessory pancreatic duct), is a duct joining the pancreas to the common bile duct. This supplies it with pancreatic juice from the exocrine pancreas, which aids in digestion.

Structure 
The pancreatic duct joins the common bile duct just prior to the ampulla of Vater, after which both ducts perforate the medial side of the second portion of the duodenum at the major duodenal papilla. There are many anatomical variants reported, but these are quite rare.

Accessory pancreatic duct

Most people have just one pancreatic duct. However, some have an additional accessory pancreatic duct, also called the Duct of Santorini. An accessory pancreatic duct can be functional or non-functional. It may open separately into the second part of the duodenum, which is dorsal, and usually (in 70% of people) drains into the duodenum via the minor duodenal papilla. In the other 30% of people, it drains into the main pancreatic duct, which drains into the duodenum via the major duodenal papilla. The main pancreatic duct and the accessory duct both eventually—either directly or indirectly—connect to the second part ('D2', the vertical segment) of the duodenum.

It is named for Giovanni Domenico Santorini.

Clinical significance
Compression, obstruction or inflammation of the pancreatic duct may lead to acute pancreatitis. The most common cause for obstruction is the presence of gallstones in the common bile duct, a condition called choledocholithiasis. Obstruction can also be due to duodenal inflammation in Crohn's disease. A gallstone may get lodged in the constricted distal end of the ampulla of Vater, where it blocks the flow of both bile and pancreatic juice into the duodenum. Bile backing up into the pancreatic duct may initiate pancreatitis. The pancreatic duct is generally regarded as abnormally enlarged if being over 3 mm in the head and 2 mm in the body or tail on CT scan. Pancreatic duct or parts of pancreatic duct can be demonstrated on ultrasound in 75 to 85% of people.

Pancreatic ductal carcinoma is a common form of pancreatic cancer.

History 
The pancreatic duct is also called the duct of Wirsung. This is named after its discoverer, the German anatomist Johann Georg Wirsung (1589–1643).

Additional images

References

Pancreas anatomy